Elwood College is a co-educational state high school in Melbourne, Victoria, Australia. It has more than 700 students, including many who live in the surrounding area and many international students. The former principal was Rhonda Holt, and the current principal is Todd Asensio. The school was founded in 1957 and was originally named Elwood High School. In its curriculum, there is English, Mathematics, Humanities, Health, Physical Education, Music, Japanese and French. They offer a wide range of Middle School and VCE subjects. It is also compulsory to learn a musical instrument up until year 9. There are many choices of instruments available, including: Flute, Clarinet, Saxophone, and many more.

School partnerships 
 Japan: Obu Higashi Senior High School

References

External links
 Elwood College home page
 Victorian Government Schools

Public high schools in Melbourne
Educational institutions established in 1957
1957 establishments in Australia
Buildings and structures in the City of Port Phillip